Ujmir is a village in Klina municipality, Kosovo. It is located south of the Klina River.

Name 
The name of the settlement translates to good water (Albanian: ujë-water, mirë-good).

History 
In the 1330 Chrysobulls of Dečani, the settlement is recorded as Ujnemir. During the Colonization of Kosovo 14 Serb and Montenegrin families settled in Ujmir.

Demographics 
There are 544 inhabitants in Ujmir as of 2011, 541 of them being Albanian, 1 being a Serb and 2 others.

Notable People 
Petar of Koriša

References 

Villages in Klina